Shangfeng may refer to the following locations in China:

 Shangfeng, Jiangxi (上奉镇), town in Xiushui County
 Shangfeng, Henan, village in Yangce, Biyang County, Zhumadian, Henan